Trailin' Back is a 1928 American silent western film directed by J.P. McGowan and starring Buddy Roosevelt,  Lafe McKee and Leon De La Mothe.

Cast
 Buddy Roosevelt 		
 Betty Baker
 Lafe McKee	
 Leon De La Mothe	
 Tom Bay
 Bert Sanderson	
 Al Bertram

References

Bibliography
 Munden, Kenneth White. The American Film Institute Catalog of Motion Pictures Produced in the United States, Part 1. University of California Press, 1997.

External links

1928 films
1928 Western (genre) films
1920s American films
American Western (genre) films
Films directed by J. P. McGowan
American silent feature films
1920s English-language films
Rayart Pictures films